Golfa railway station is a preserved station that serves the area of Golfa, Powys, Wales, on the Welshpool and Llanfair Light Railway.

History 
The station opened on 6 April 1903 by the Cambrian Railways. It was a request stop. It was known as The Golfa in the Montgomeryshire Echo. It closed to passengers on 9 February 1931 but reopened as a preserved station on 18 July 1981.

References 

Disused railway stations in Powys
Railway stations in Great Britain opened in 1903
Railway stations in Great Britain closed in 1931
Railway stations in Great Britain opened in 1981
1903 establishments in Wales
1931 disestablishments in Wales
1981 establishments in Wales